Lepetella tubicola is a species of sea snail, a marine gastropod mollusk in the family Lepetellidae.

Distribution
This species occurs in the Northwest Atlantic Ocean and in the Gulf of Mexico, off Louisiana.

Description 
The maximum recorded shell length is 3.75 mm. The thin, white shell has a conical shape. The apex is acute and nearly central. The broad aperture is elliptical, oblong or subcircular. It is usually more or less warped, owing to its habitat. The edge is thin and simple. There is no sculpture. The growth lines are slight. The outer surface is dull white. The inner surface is smooth with the pallial markings faint.

Habitat 
Minimum recorded depth is 238 m. Maximum recorded depth is 710 m.

References

 Verrill, A. E. 1880. Notice of the remarkable marine fauna occupying the outer banks off the southern coast of New England. American Journal of Science (3)20: 390–403
 Smith, S.M.; Heppell, D. (1991). Checklist of the British marine Mollusca.
 Rosenberg, G. 2004. Malacolog Version 3.3.2: Western Atlantic gastropod database. The Academy of Natural Sciences, Philadelphia, PA., available online at http://www.malacolog.org 
 Rosenberg, G., F. Moretzsohn, and E. F. García. 2009. Gastropoda (Mollusca) of the Gulf of Mexico, Pp. 579–699 in Felder, D.L. and D.K. Camp (eds.), Gulf of Mexico–Origins, Waters, and Biota. Biodiversity. Texas A&M Press, College Station, Texas.

External links

Lepetellidae
Gastropods described in 1880